Sasha Bordeaux is a fictional character appearing in American comic books published by DC Comics. The character was at first primarily associated with superhero Batman, and she has subsequently evolved an association with Checkmate in two of its incarnations. Sasha Bordeaux was created by Greg Rucka and Shawn Martinbrough, and first appeared in Detective Comics #751 (December 2000).

Fictional character biography

Bodyguard and superhero
Sasha Bordeaux first appears as a young martial artist who is hired as Bruce Wayne's bodyguard by WayneCorp's second-in-command, Lucius Fox, albeit against Wayne's wishes. Wayne at first tries to avoid her, but she keeps on doing her job.

She eventually becomes suspicious of his constant late-night disappearances, does some searching, and is shocked to find that Bruce Wayne is secretly Batman. Since she already knows his secret identity, Batman begins training her to become his apprentice. After weeks of hard work, she becomes fit enough to go out with him on patrol in a suit, though he still treats her as a total stranger both as Batman and as Bruce Wayne. During this time, she falls in love with him, even though he is dating other women.

Framed
One night while Batman and Bordeaux are out on patrol, the assassin David Cain lures Wayne's ex-girlfriend Vesper Fairchild to Wayne Manor and kills her, framing Wayne in the process. Both Wayne and Bordeaux are charged with murder, and Sasha refuses to exonerate herself by giving up Wayne's secret despite the fact that they were patrolling separate areas at the time of the murder and therefore even she cannot be sure of Bruce's innocence. They are both arraigned and held without bail while awaiting trial. After a while, Batman escapes to leave his alter ego behind, leaving Bordeaux inside Blackgate prison. Although Sasha is briefly offered her freedom if she testifies against Bruce Wayne - even contemplating taking the deal after Bruce abandones her - a meeting with Alfred Pennyworth leaves her resolved to reject the offer. Alfred helps her realize that Bruce truly valued her work, rather than using her without any thought for herself, as otherwise he would never have allowed her to accompany him as Batman. Batman eventually confronts those who framed him, and Wayne and Sasha are cleared of all charges.

Checkmate
While in prison custody, Sasha is severely wounded by another prisoner and would have died had the government agency Checkmate not given her medical treatment. They fake her death and offer to give her a new name and identity (complete with plastic surgery) if she works for them. With no other options, she agrees.

Batman tirelessly searches for Sasha, not believing she died in prison. To facilitate this, he disrupts all of Checkmate's operations in Gotham City. The group eventually organizes a meeting between the two, where Wayne confesses his love for her. Sasha, though feeling the same way, realizes that her new life would prevent them from being together and tells him to let her go.

Over time, Bordeaux rises through the ranks of Checkmate and becomes right hand to Maxwell Lord, the group's leader. Lord later hijacks the Brother I satellite that Batman created to monitor all superhuman activity. Brother I itself recently became sentient due to the actions of Alexander Luthor, Jr. as a part of his plans for the Infinite Crisis. He also creates an army of cyborgs known as OMACs (humans transformed by a virus) programmed to hunt and kill all superhumans and/or specific targets. During his rule, Lord kills all who oppose him, assisted by Brother I who monitors for rebellion. Sasha feigns loyalty to stay alive, but breaks the pretense when Lord kills his former ally Blue Beetle (Ted Kord) and orders Sasha to dispose of his corpse. Filled with hatred for herself and Lord, she sends Kord's trademark goggles to Batman as part of a message detailing Lord's madness.

After revealing Sasha's betrayal, Brother I sends out an OMAC squad, who finds Sasha and Batman in an abandoned warehouse just after they share a kiss. The OMACs' goal of killing Batman and taking Sasha only partly succeeds, as Batman escapes. Realizing he cannot get any information out of Sasha, Lord imprisons her and brainwashes Superman in an attempt to kill Batman. To stop this, Wonder Woman snaps Lord's neck, killing him instantly.

Cyborg
With the help of another imprisoned agent, Jessica Midnight (who attempted to assassinate Lord earlier), Bordeaux escapes and sets out to kill Lord, unaware he is already dead. As they are on their way out, an OMAC attacks the two and impales Bordeaux. This attack somehow activates her latent inner programming, turning her into an OMAC cyborg. She retains most of her human features, although her skin now resembles a metallic coating and one of her eye sockets is empty. She also retains her free will; unlike the other OMACs, she is not under Brother I's control. 

With Lord's death, Brother I rechristens itself "Brother Eye" and activates all the remaining OMACs to kill Earth's superhumans. Bordeaux contacts the other various factions of Checkmate who left after Lord's takeover, apologizing for Lord and asking them to rejoin.

She then creates a computer virus and hooks herself up to the Brother Eye satellite. The virus, along with a massive electromagnetic pulse blast created by the various superheroes, disables the majority of the OMACs. Brother I escapes with 200,000 OMACS. 

She later reunites with Batman. After she tells him she is now a machine, he comforts her.

Infinite Crisis
Eventually, with the aid of the new Blue Beetle, Batman locates Brother Eye. He then gathers a team of heroes, including Bordeaux, to attempt to destroy it (Infinite Crisis #5 and #6). The attack sends Brother Eye crashing to Earth, but the satellite's central memory remains intact. With the various superheroes needed elsewhere, Batman tasks Bordeaux with destroying Brother Eye once and for all. Sasha resists the machine's brainwashing long enough to blow it up. She survives the blast, albeit at the cost of the majority of her OMAC shell.

One year later
One year after Infinite Crisis, Bordeaux becomes the "Black Queen" of the Checkmate organization. Her consequentialist attitude towards the success of Checkmate missions puts her into conflict with Alan Scott. She is also in conflict with several of her Checkmate colleagues, particularly Fire and Mister Terrific, with whom she is romantically involved. In a 2007 story arc involving The Outsiders, Bordeaux suffers extreme torture at the hands of Chang Tzu who wishes to learn more about her cybernetic implants. After barely surviving this encounter, it takes her some time to regain her confidence, especially when the healing process results in even more of her body becoming cybernetic.

In Manhunter (vol. 3) #27 (January 2007), Sasha intervenes in the trial of Wonder Woman (for murdering Maxwell Lord) by secretly delivering exonerating evidence to Wonder Woman's lawyer, Kate Spencer.

Final Crisis
During the events of "Final Crisis", Sasha forms a small resistance team that includes Snapper Carr, her current romantic interest Mister Terrific, an artificial intelligence, and later the villain Cheetah. They cause much damage against the conquering forces of Darkseid, mainly utilizing Snapper's teleportation power. When Sasha is infected by the Anti-Life Formula, the OMAC nanites in her body put her in a coma to prevent the spread of the infection. After Snapper's powers are neutralized, Mister Terrific realizes they have to re-activate all the OMACS that are left. The only way to do this is to revive Sasha and retrieve the OMAC codes from her nanites. The activation of the OMACs is successful, but the revival causes Sasha's biological processes to shut down.

JSA vs. Kobra
In the 2009 miniseries "JSA Vs. Kobra", Mr. Terrific and Dr. Mid-Nite are keeping a comatose Sasha alive via life support in hopes of being able to cure her. By the end of the series, Sasha is restored to life and passionately kisses Mr. Terrific. This is her last appearance for six years.

DC Rebirth
A new interpretation of Sasha debuts in Wonder Woman volume 3 as part of the DC Rebirth initiative. In the new continuity, Sasha is a superior to Etta Candy, and is introduced discussing Steve Trevor's mission in the African jungle and a nearby sighting of Wonder Woman. She is revealed to be linked to an evil artificial intelligence which is monitoring her and attempting to manipulate Wonder Woman from afar.

Powers and abilities
Even before her transformation, Sasha is a skilled hand-to-hand combatant and marksman. She is skilled enough that Batman allows her to serve as a sidekick of sorts.

After capturing Sasha and studying her, Chang Tzu discovers that she has the following abilities:
 "A rough ten-to-twenty percent enhancement over even an Olympic level athlete across the board--in strength, stamina, endurance, speed, dexterity...". During the procedure, she also demonstrates a rapidly increasing tolerance to the sedatives being used to keep her unconscious.
 "(Via Sasha's) ocular implant, the whole of the visual spectrum and more, revealed to you". Earlier in the same storyline, Sasha demonstrates the ability to see in the infrared spectrum.
 "Optimized targeting optics...you must make a terrifyingly accurate sniper..."
 "Body parts encased in the OMAC composite shell...nanobot scabs covering your weaker flesh".

Sasha also has the ability to turn her nanorobotic components on and off at will. They also help her to regenerate from damage she sustains, particularly to those non-biological parts of her body.

Notes

References

Characters created by Greg Rucka
Comics characters introduced in 2000
DC Comics characters with accelerated healing
DC Comics characters with superhuman strength
DC Comics female superheroes
Fictional bodyguards
DC Comics cyborgs
Fictional American secret agents
Vigilante characters in comics